Andy Parker may refer to:

Andy Parker (businessman) (born 1969), British businessman, CEO of Capita
Andy Parker (musician) (born 1952), British drummer
Andy Parker (illustrator), British illustrator
Andy Parker (American football) (born 1961), American football player
Andy Parker (physicist), professor of high energy physics

See also
Andrew Parker (disambiguation)